The 1992 Internazionali di Tennis di San Marino was a men's tennis tournament played on outdoor clay courts at the Centro Tennis Cassa di Risparmio di Fonte dell'Ovo in the City of San Marino in San Marino and was part of the World Series of the 1992 ATP Tour. It was the fourth edition of the tournament and was held from 27 July until 2 August 1992. First-seeded Karel Nováček won the singles title.

Finals

Singles

 Karel Nováček defeated  Francisco Clavet 7–5, 6–2
 It was Nováček's 2nd title of the year and the 9th of his career.

Doubles

 Nicklas Kulti /  Mikael Tillström defeated  Cristian Brandi /  Federico Mordegan 6–2, 6–2

See also
 1992 Internazionali di Tennis San Marino – women's tournament

References

External links
 ITF tournament edition details

Campionati Internazionali di San Marino
San Marino CEPU Open
1992 in Sammarinese sport